Dizkuh may refer to:

Diz Kuh, Gilan, Iran
Dizkuh or Shahdiz, fortress near Isfahan, Iran
Qaleh-ye Dezh Kuh, village in Kohgiluyeh and Boyer-Ahmad Province, Iran